American singer and songwriter Julian Casablancas has won 2 awards from 8 nominations as a soloist.

Grammy Awards
The Grammy Awards are awarded annually by The Recording Academy of the United States for outstanding achievements in the music industry.

!scope="col"|
|-
!scope="row"| 2014
|rowspan=1|Random Access Memories 
| Album of the Year 
| 
| style="text-align:center;"| 
|-
!scope="row"| 2021
|rowspan=1|The New Abnormal 
| Best Rock Album 
| 
|-
|}

NME Awards
The NME Awards were created by the NME magazine and was first held in 1953.

!
|-
!scope="row" rowspan="2"| 2003
| rowspan="3"| Julian Casablancas
| Best Dressed
| 
| rowspan="2" style="text-align:center;"| 
|-
|Hottest Man
| 
|-
|rowspan="1"| 2010
| Best Solo Artist
| 
| style="text-align:center;"|
|-
|2015
|"I don't know how many white people having brunch I can deal with on a Saturday afternoon."
| Best Quote
| 
| style="text-align:center;"|
|-
|}

World Music Awards
The World Music Awards is an annual international awards show founded in 1989 that honours recording artists based on worldwide sales figures provided by the International Federation of the Phonographic Industry (IFPI).

!
|-
!scope="row" rowspan="2"| 2014
| rowspan="2"| "Instant Crush"
| World's Best Song
| 
| style="text-align:center;" rowspan=2|
|-
| World's Best Music Video
| 
|-
|}

References

Casablancas, Julian